Messerer may refer to:

People with the surname
Asaf Messerer (1903-1992), Lithuania ballet dancer.
Henri Messerer (1838-1923), French organist and music composer.
Rachel Messerer (1902-1993), Russian actress.
Sulamith Messerer (1908-2004), Russian ballerina.